Notable people with the name Padmanabhan deshpande 

include:

C. M. Padmanabhan Nair (?–1977), an Indian politician
Dayal Padmanabhan, an Indian film director and producer
Govindarajan Padmanabhan, a renowned biochemist and a pioneer in Indian biotechnology
Manjula Padmanabhan, a playwright, journalist, comic strip artist, and children's book author
Mannathu Padmanabha Pillai (1878–1970), an Indian social reformer and a freedom fighter
Mohan Padmanabhan, an Indian economist and journalist
Neela Padmanabhan, a Tamil writer
Padmanabhan Balaram, an Indian biochemist
Padmanabhan Nair (1928–2007), an eminent Kathakali exponent
Padmanabhan Palpu (1963–1950), a bacteriologist and social revolutionary
Padmanabhan Sivadas, an Indian cricketer
Sundararajan Padmanabhan, the former Chief of Army Staff of the Indian Army
Thanu Padmanabhan (1957–2021), an Indian theoretical physicist
Thinakkal Padmanabhan, a short story writer
Uma Padmanabhan, a Tamil socialite, actress and news presenter
Vijay Padmanabhan, a law professor
 Dr. R.S Padmanabhan Leading Dental surgeon of Karnataka -1946, Qualified at Vienna

See also
Budget Padmanabhan, a South Indian Tamil film

Given names